WPGW-FM (100.9 FM) is a radio station broadcasting a country music format. It is licensed to Portland, Indiana, in the United States. The station is currently owned by Wpgw, Inc.

Early history
Glenn West, a local electronic engineer, founded WPGW (AM) in 1951. He and his wife owned and operated the station until 1974. WPGW-FM was granted to West as a construction permit by the Federal Communications Commission (FCC) in 1973 but was put up for sale due to West's advancing age and health concerns. Both stations were sold in the summer of 1974 to Bob Brandon (previously with WOWO in Fort Wayne).

WPGW-FM made its debut one year later on May 19, 1975. Both stations remain owned and operated by its company and licensee WPGW Inc.

In 1980, Rob Weaver purchased WPGW Inc. and both stations from Bob Brandon.

Jay Country 101
A country music format was adopted in 1980 after a five-year simulcast of its AM sister "PG-14" with an adult contemporary format. That format and branding remains in place.

WPGW-FM's sister station is WZBD (the former WQTZ) founded in August 1993 located to the north in Berne, operating under the licensee name Adams County Radio Inc.

References

External links
Official WPGW website

 WPGW information at the Indiana Radio Archive

PGW-FM
Country radio stations in the United States
Jay County, Indiana